Events from the year 1560 in art.

Events
 Giorgio Vasari begins work on the Uffizi in Florence for Cosimo I de' Medici as offices for the Florentine magistrates.

Works

Pieter Bruegel the Elder – Children's Games
Valerio Cioli - Fontana del Bacchino at the Boboli Gardens in Florence
Juan de Juanes – The Last Supper
Maso da San Friano – Visitation (altarpiece)
Antonis Mor – Portrait of the artist Jan van Scorel
Steven van der Meulen – Elizabeth Clinton
Karel van Mander – Prince Christian of Denmark

Births
June 25 – Juan Sánchez Cotán, Spanish painter (died 1626)
November 3 – Annibale Carracci, Italian painter (died 1609)
date unknown
Giovanni Balducci, also called Il Cosci, Italian mannerist painter (died 1600)
Bartolomeo Carducci, Italian painter (died 1608)
Wenceslas Cobergher, Flemish Renaissance architect, engineer, painter, antiquarian, numismatist and economist (died 1634)
Adriaen Collaert, Flemish engraver (died 1618)
Dominicus Custos, Flemish printer and copperplate engraver (died 1612)
Bartholomeus Dolendo, Dutch engraver (died unknown)
Giovanni Niccolo, Italian Jesuit painter (died 1626)
Diego Polo the Elder, Spanish painter (died 1600)
Claudio Ridolfi, Italian painter (died 1644)
Daniel Soreau, German still life painter (died 1619)
Antonio Viviani, Italian painter of frescoes (died 1620)
probable
Ludovico Buti, Italian painter active mostly in Florence (died 1611)
Baldassare d'Anna, Italian painter of the late-Renaissance period (died 1639)
Paolo Camillo Landriani, Italian painter (died 1618)
Arent Passer, stonemason and architect (died 1637)
Marietta Robusti, Venetian painter of the Renaissance period (died 1590)
Fabrizio Santafede, Italian late-Mannerist painter (died 1635)
Domenico Tintoretto, Venetian painter, son of Jacopo Tintoretto (died 1635)
1560/1561: Rafael Sadeler I, Flemish engraver of the Sadeler family (died 1628/1632)

Deaths
February 7 – Bartolommeo Bandinelli, Florentine sculptor (born 1493)
date unknown
Antonio Badile, Italian painter from Verona (born 1518)
Giovanni Battista Caporali, Italian painter (born c.1476)
Francesco Vecellio, Venetian painter of the early Renaissance (born 1485), best known as the elder brother of the painter Titian.
probable 
Hans Sebald Lautensack, German painter and etcher (born 1524)
Herri met de Bles, Flemish Mannerist landscape painter (born c.1510)
Frans Mostaert, Flemish landscape painter (born 1428)
Heinrich Zell, German printer and cartographer (born unknown)

References

 
Years of the 16th century in art